Helmut Röhrl or Rohrl (born 22 March 1927 in Straubing, died 30 January 2014) was a German mathematician.

Besides complex analysis (including among other subjects the Riemann–Hilbert problem), he worked on algebra and category theory and totally convex spaces. In 1964 he edited the new edition of the classic textbook on complex analysis by Adolf Hurwitz and Richard Courant.

Röhrl received his doctorate in 1949 at the Ludwig-Maximilians-Universität München under Robert König (and Oskar Perron) with doctoral thesis Über Differentialsysteme, welche aus multiplikativen Klassen mit exponentiellen Singularitäten entspringen and his habilitation in 1953 with habilitation thesis Abelsche Integrale auf Riemannschen Flächen endlichen Geschlechts. He was a docent in mathematics from 1949 to 1951 in Würzburg, from 1951 to 1953 in Munich, from 1953 to 1955 in Münster under Heinrich Behnke and from 1955 to 1958 again in Munich. In the academic year 1958–1959 he was at the University of Chicago, became in 1959 an associate professor and subsequently professor at the University of Minnesota and was from 1964 a professor at the University of California, San Diego.

In the academic 1962–1963 Röhrl was a visiting professor at Harvard University, in 1967–1968 at Princeton University, in 1972–1973 at the University of Munich, and at the University of Fribourg, the FernUniversität Hagen, the University of Göttingen, and the Technical University Munich, and in 1976 at the University of Nagoya.

Works
Das Riemann-Hilbert’sche Problem der linearen Differentialgleichungen, Mathematische Annalen, vol. 133, 1957, pp. 1–25. 
as annotator and editor: Adolf Hurwitz, Richard Courant Lehrbuch der Funktionentheorie, Springer Verlag, 4th edn. 1964 
annotations (pp. 551–696) forming two new chapters: Weitere Abbildungstheoreme der Funktionentheorie (including quasiconformal mappings) and Holomorphe und meromorphe Funktionen auf Riemannschen Flächen (including the Riemann–Roch theorem, Runge approximation theorem, topology and vector bundles on Riemann surfaces, and automorphe functions)

with Dieter Pumplün: Banach spaces and totally convex spaces, parts 1, 2, Comm. in Algebra, vol. 12, 1984, pp. 935–1019; vol. 13, 1985, pp. 1047–1113

See also
Function of several complex variables
Hilbert's twenty-first problem

References

External links
Homepage at the UCSD

20th-century German mathematicians
People from Straubing
1927 births
2014 deaths
Academic staff of the Technical University of Munich
University of California, San Diego faculty